Reginald Abraham Mengi (1943 – May 2, 2019) was a Tanzanian billionaire, businessperson, philanthropist, and author of the book  I Can, I Must, I Will.
Reginald Abraham Mengi was born into a poor family in Northern Tanzania and raised in a mud hut which the family shared with cows, sheep, goats and chickens. He had one meal a day and sometimes none at all and walked to school barefoot. Notwithstanding these circumstances he managed to study accountancy and articles with Cooper Brothers in the United Kingdom and after being accepted as a member of the Institute of Chartered Accountants of England and Wales, he returned to Tanzania in 1971 and was employed by the accounting firm of Coopers & Lybrand Tanzania. He stayed with Coopers & Lybrand Tanzania (now PriceWaterHouseCoopers) up to September 1989 during which time he became its Chairman and Managing Partner. In October 1989 Dr. Mengi left Coopers & Lybrand Tanzania to concentrate on his own businesses. Today his flagship IPP Limited and its associated companies rank amongst the largest private companies in Tanzania
. He was the Chairman of Tanzania Private Sector Foundation (TPSF), Confederation of Tanzania Industries, IPP Gold Ltd., Media Owners Association of Tanzania, Executive Chairman & Owner at IPP Ltd. (Tanzania) and Chairman of Handeni Gold, Inc. Mengi had an estimated net worth of US$560 million as per Forbes richest people in Africa 2014.

Honors and awards 
Mengi has received the following awards:

 2000–2003 – Most Respected CEO East Africa Community (EAC)
 2008 –    Martin Luther King Drum Major for Justice Award 
 2010 –   Global Leadership and Humanitarian Award
 2012  –  United Nations NGO Lifetime Achievement Award
 2012 –   The Oslo Business for Peace Award 
 2012 –    Honorary Doctor of Humanity Degree Award
 2014 –    International Order of the Lions Award
 2014 –    Business Leader of the Year Award
 2019 – Award winner of Appreciation  from PRINCEmosha BRAND

References

External links 
 Official website

1944 births
2019 deaths
Tanzanian businesspeople
Tanzanian philanthropists
People from Kilimanjaro Region
20th-century philanthropists